Randall Jude Skarda (born May 5, 1968 in West St. Paul, Minnesota) is a former professional ice hockey defenseman.  He was drafted in the eighth round, 157th overall, by the St. Louis Blues in the 1986 NHL Entry Draft.  He played twenty-six games in the National Hockey League with the Blues: twenty-five in the 1989–90 season and one more in the 1991–92 season.

Awards and honors

References

External links

1968 births
American men's ice hockey defensemen
Hershey Bears players
Ice hockey players from Minnesota
Johnstown Chiefs players
Living people
Milwaukee Admirals (IHL) players
Minnesota Arctic Blast players
Minnesota Golden Gophers men's ice hockey players
People from West St. Paul, Minnesota
Peoria Rivermen (IHL) players
Prince Edward Island Senators players
St. Louis Blues draft picks
St. Louis Blues players
AHCA Division I men's ice hockey All-Americans